Giampiero Borghini (born 20 April 1943) is a Socialist politician and translator from Russia. He was also affiliated with Forza Italia. He was born in Brescia. He was mayor of Milan.

References

1943 births
Mayors of Milan
20th-century Italian politicians
21st-century Italian politicians
Italian translators
Italian Communist Party politicians
Forza Italia politicians
Translators from Russian
Living people